Sinomeganeura is an extinct genus of griffinfly in the family Meganeuridae and containing a single species Sinomeganeura huangheensis.  The species is known only from Late Carboniferous, Namurian stage, Tupo Formation near the village of Xiaheyan in Ningxia Hui Autonomous Region, China.

History and classification
Sinomeganeura huangheensis is known only from one fossil, the holotype, specimen number "CNU-NX200". It is a single, mostly complete fore-wing, preserved as a compression fossil in fine grained sedimentary rock.  The fossil specimen is from exposures of the Tupo Formation in the Qilianshan Mountains.  Insect fossils from this formation, referred to as part of the "Qilianshan biota", are the first Namurian insects found in the far east and are the oldest insects known from China.  The type specimen is currently preserved in the Key Lab of Insect Evolution & Environmental Changes collections housed in the Capital Normal University, located in Beijing, China.  Sinomeganeura was first studied by Dong Ren of Capital Normal University, André Nel of the Muséum national d'histoire naturelle in Paris, France and Jakub Prokop of Charles University in Prague, Czech Republic.  Their 2008 type description of the genus and species was published in the journal Insect Systematic Evolution.  The generic name was coined by Prokop, Nel, and Ren from a combination of the Latin sino meaning China and the name of the related genus Meganeura. The etymology of the specific epithet huangheensis is a reference to the Yellow River which flows next to the type locality outcrop.

Sinomeganeura huangheensis is the third genus of Meganeuridae to be described from Namurian after Namurotypus described in 1989 and Shenzhousia described in 2006.

Description
The holotype fore-wing is well preserved and mostly complete, though it is missing only the wing apex and shows no indications of any color pattering that may have been present in life. Despite the size difference, Sinomeganeura huangheensis was placed in Meganeurinae based on the presence of fused CuP and CuA veins in the fore-wing. S. huangheensis can be separated from other genera in the subfamily by various aspects of the fine vein structuring in the wing.

References

Meganisoptera
Pennsylvanian insects
Bashkirian life
Carboniferous animals of Asia
Paleozoic insects of Asia
Fossil taxa described in 2008
Prehistoric animals of China